Intercept Pharmaceuticals, Inc. is an American biopharmaceutical company incorporated in 2002, focusing on the development of novel synthetic bile acid analogs to treat chronic liver diseases, such as primary biliary cirrhosis (PBC) now called primary biliary cholangitis, non-alcoholic fatty liver disease (or non-alcoholic steatohepatitis, NASH), cirrhosis, portal hypertension, primary sclerosing cholangitis and also the intestinal disorder, bile acid diarrhea.

Products
The company's lead product is obeticholic acid, OCA, also known as 6-ethyl-chenodeoxycholic acid or INT-747, marketed as Ocaliva.  OCA is a potent first-in-class farnesoid X receptor (FXR) agonist.  As of March 2017, Ocaliva is approved in the US and the EU for use in primary biliary cholangitis.  It is in phase III studies for non-alcoholic steatohepatitis (NASH) and phase II studies for primary sclerosing cholangitis.

Other products in the development pipeline include INT-767, a dual FXR/TGR5 agonist, and INT-777, a TGR5 agonist.

On June 29, 2020, the company released a statement announcing that FDA had rejected its lead product obeticholic acid, OCA, because FDA officials had determined that "the predicted benefit of the drug does not sufficiently outweigh the predicted risks".

Initial public offering and stock history
Intercept trades on the NASDAQ exchange under the ticker symbol ICPT.  The initial public offering of the stock on October 16, 2012 was at $15.  A follow-on public offering at $33 took place on June 24, 2013.

On January 9, 2014, the stock skyrocketed from $72.39 to $275.49, or about 280%, after a planned interim analysis by the independent data safety monitoring board showed that Obeticholic acid met the main goal (improvement of liver histology) at the mid-stage in the FLINT trial in NASH, sponsored by NIDDK.  The stock continued to climb to $497 over the next few days before falling back to around $317 on March 29, 2014, giving a market capitalization of around $6.2 billion.

In March 2014, the company released the results of the POISE study of Obeticholic acid in PBC, which showed the drug met the trial's primary endpoint of a reduction in serum alkaline phosphatase, a biomarker for the disease.  These results were presented at an international liver meeting in April 2014.

As of 31 December 2014, the company has 136 employees.

References

External links
 

Companies listed on the Nasdaq
Biotechnology companies of the United States
Pharmaceutical companies based in New Jersey
Companies based in Morris County, New Jersey